Acinetobacter modestus is a bacterium from the genus Acinetobacter.

References

External links
Type strain of Acinetobacter modestus at BacDive -  the Bacterial Diversity Metadatabase

Moraxellaceae
Bacteria described in 2016